In August 2016, several rainstorms hit the western and northwestern parts of the Republic of Macedonia. On 6 August 2016, a storm with strong winds and flooding hit Skopje and the western parts of the country, leaving at least 21 people dead and dozens injured or missing.

Events 
In the afternoon of 6 August 2016 at 5:30 pm CEST, a heavy rain began falling in the area of the country's capital Skopje, resulting in strong winds and floods. The rain was reported to have stopped around 9:30 am CEST the next day, with the peak of the storm in the middle of the night, around 3:30 am CEST. Macedonia's weather service reported that  fell in two hours on Skopje, which is equivalent to the average for an entire month of August. Meteorologists reported that more than 800 lightning strikes were recorded in the first two hours of the storm, which went on for about five hours in total. At least 21 people died, with dozens of others injured or missing. The local media reported that the ambulances were called 65 times in the city, more than 20 people were treated and the army were called in to help. Three villages to the northeast of the city were cut off due to landslides.

Reactions 
The deputy prime minister Nikola Todorov called the storm a "catastrophe of unprecedented proportion".  Mayor of Skopje Koce Trajanovski said that the city never experienced such a disaster. The government declared state of emergency and 8 August was declared national day of mourning.

See also 
 2014 Bulgarian floods, a similar localized and deadly event triggered by extreme rainfall
 2014 Southeast Europe floods, which affected 10 countries, causing 86 deaths and at least 1 billion euros in damages
 2016 European floods
 List of floods in Europe

References 

Macedonian floods
Macedonian floods
Floods
Macedonian floods
Floods in North Macedonia
Macedonian floods, 2016